Lyubimets Nunatak (‘Nunatak Lyubimets’ \'nu-na-tak lyu-'bi-mets\) is the partly ice-covered rocky ridge extending 3.9 km in north-northeast to south-southwest direction and 1.8 km wide, rising to 963 m in Bartók Glacier on the west side of Elgar Uplands in northern Alexander Island, Antarctica. The feature is named after the town of Lyubimets in Southern Bulgaria.

Location

Maps
 British Antarctic Territory. Scale 1:200000 topographic map. DOS 610 – W 69 70. Tolworth, UK, 1971
 Antarctic Digital Database (ADD). Scale 1:250000 topographic map of Antarctica. Scientific Committee on Antarctic Research (SCAR). Since 1993, regularly upgraded and updated

Notes

References
 Bulgarian Antarctic Gazetteer. Antarctic Place-names Commission. (details in Bulgarian, basic data in English)
 Lyubimets Nunatak. SCAR Composite Gazetteer of Antarctica

External links
 Lyubimets Nunatak. Copernix satellite image

Nunataks of Alexander Island
Bulgaria and the Antarctic